Valeriy Valeriyovych Kudriashov is a Ukrainian sailor. He competed at the 2012 Summer Olympics in the Men's Laser class.

References

Ukrainian male sailors (sport)
1984 births
Living people
Sportspeople from Mariupol
Olympic sailors of Ukraine
Sailors at the 2012 Summer Olympics – Laser